Turkish cold bulgur soup, Bat or Bad is a national meal of Tokat,Sivas,Amasya Turkish cuisine. Original name of this recipe is bat. This recipe is  similar to mercimek köftesi by means of preparation.

Regional Bat Styles
Tokat Bat

See also
Kısır

References

Turkish soups